A referendum on extending the term length for the President, Senators and members of the House of Representatives was held in Liberia on 7 May 1907. It lengthened the terms of all such officials: the President (two years to four), House of Representatives (two years to four), and the Senate (four years to six).

Results

References

Referendums in Liberia
1907 referendums
1907 in Liberia
Constitutional referendums in Liberia
May 1907 events